Niponius is a genus of clown beetles in the family Histeridae, the sole genus in the subfamily Niponiinae. There are more than 20 described species in Niponius.

Species
These 24 species belong to the genus Niponius:

 Niponius andrewesi Lewis, 1893
 Niponius bicolor Gardner, 1935
 Niponius canalicollis Lewis, 1901
 Niponius foveicollis Lewis, 1913
 Niponius furcatus Lewis, 1885
 Niponius himalayensis Gardner, 1926
 Niponius impressicollis Lewis, 1885
 Niponius interstitialis Lewis, 1913
 Niponius magnus Sengupta & Pal, 1995
 Niponius obtusiceps Lewis, 1885
 Niponius osorioceps Lewis, 1885
 Niponius parvulus Lewis, 1893
 Niponius piceae Reichardt, 1933
 Niponius polinae Reichardt, 1936
 Niponius punjabensis Gardner, 1926
 Niponius simplicipygus Reichardt, 1938
 Niponius striaticeps Lewis, 1904
 Niponius substriatus Gardner, 1926
 Niponius tamanukii Kono, 1937
 Niponius tenuis Sengupta & Pal, 1995
 Niponius unidentatus Lewis, 1913
 Niponius unistrius Lewis, 1913
 Niponius variabilis Gardner, 1926
 Niponius yamasakii Miwa, 1934

References

Further reading

 

Histeridae
Staphyliniformia genera
Taxa named by George Lewis (coleopterist)